Baron Reith , of Stonehaven in the County of Kincardine, is a title in the Peerage of the United Kingdom. It was created in 1940 for Sir John Reith, the first Director-General of the BBC. His only son, the second Baron, disclaimed the peerage for life in 1972. Since 2016, the title is held by the latter's son, the third Baron.

Barons Reith (1940)
John Charles Walsham Reith, 1st Baron Reith (1889–1971)
Christopher John Reith, 2nd Baron Reith (1928–2016) (disclaimed 1972)
James Harry John Reith, 3rd Baron Reith (b. 1971)

The heir apparent is the present holder's son, Hon. Harry Joseph Reith (b. 2006)

References

Baronies in the Peerage of the United Kingdom
Noble titles created in 1940
Noble titles created for UK MPs